Ayla may refer to:

 Ayla (name), a given name in some languages, especially a common Turkish name
 Ayla (city), a medieval city at the site of Aqaba, Jordan
 Ayla (Earth's Children)
Ayla (Chrono Trigger), a character from the 1995 video game Chrono Trigger
 Daihatsu Ayla, another name for the car Toyota Agya
 Lae Airfield, an airport with ICAO code "AYLA"
 Ayla (producer), a German trance producer and DJ
 Ayla: The Daughter of War, a 2017 Korean - Turkish film
 "Ayla", a song by Australian pop group Flash and the Pan